Microgomphus is a genus of dragonfly in the family Gomphidae. It contains the following species:
 Microgomphus camerunensis Longfield, 1951
 Microgomphus chelifer Selys, 1858
 Microgomphus corbeti Pinhey, 1951
 Microgomphus jannyae Legrand, 1992
 Microgomphus jurzitzai Karube, 2000
 Microgomphus lilliputians Fraser, 1923
 Microgomphus loogali Fraser, 1923
 Microgomphus nyassicus (Grünberg, 1902)
 Microgomphus schoutedeni Fraser, 1949
 Microgomphus souteri Fraser, 1924
 Microgomphus thailandica Asahina, 1981
 Microgomphus torquatus (Selys, 1854)
 Microgomphus verticalis (Selys, 1873)
 Microgomphus wijaya Lieftinck, 1940
 Microgomphus zebra (Martin, 1911)

References 

Gomphidae
Anisoptera genera
Taxonomy articles created by Polbot